John J. Jadick, better known as Johnny Jadick (June 16, 1908 – April 3, 1970) was an American light welterweight boxer and the NBA light welterweight world champion in 1932. In September of 1932, the NBA decided not to recognize junior divisions. Jadick continued to reign as the world light welterweight champion until February of 1933 when he was defeated by Battling Shaw for the championship which had been continually recognized by the Louisiana State boxing commission. He was born and raised in Philadelphia, Pennsylvania.   Though not an exceptionally strong puncher, he had great speed, and an effective left jab.  He was managed by Tommy White, and trained by Joe Ferguson.

Early life and career 
John Jadick was born on June 16, 1908, in the Kensington section of Philadelphia where he spent most of his life. 

One of his first professional victories came in 1925, when he defeated Harry Decker in an eight-round decision.  Between July 1923, and March 1927, he won 42 of 45 fights, with only two losses and one draw.   In his early career in Philadelphia, Jadick was often managed and promoted by Johhny Burns, particularly when he fought at the Cambria Athletic Club, where Burns worked.   Jadick once admitted he patterned his style of boxing from Tommy Loughran, a famous Philadelphian light heavyweight champion, also managed briefly by Burns in his early career.  Jadick was quite tall for a lightweight at 5' 8", which gave him an advantage in defending blows, though he lacked the power of some stockier competitors.

On March 12, 1928, Jadick lost to Pete Nebo in a ten-round points decision at the Arena in Philadelphia.  Both fought in the featherweight range of 126 pounds.  Nebo won from hard, accurate blows at close quarters and when coming out of clinches.  Having only a two-inch disadvantage in reach, he was able to maneuver effectively during the infighting to score points.  In their two subsequent meetings, Nebo won in a close eight-round newspaper decision on May 6, 1927, in Camden, New Jersey, and March 12, 1928, in a ten-round points decision at the Arena in Philadelphia.

He defeated English-born Jewish lightweight boxing great Al Foreman on May 21, 1928, in an eight-round points decision at the Polo Grounds in New York. One of Jadick's better known opponents, Foreman would take the Canadian, British Empire, and British Board of Control (BBOC) World Lightweight Championships during his career.   

On August 8, 1928, Jadick lost to Dick "Honeyboy" Finnegan, considered a serious Jr. Lightweight contender, at Braves Field in Boston, Massachusetts, in a ten-round points decision.  Finnegan won an easy victory by exhibiting more speed than Jadick. He won six of the rounds, with Jadick winning only one, and three even.   Jadick had defeated Finnegan two months earlier fighting in the lightweight range in a ten-round points decision in his hometown at Shibe Park in Philadelphia before an enormous crowd of 18,000. Jadick built up a lead, taking the first two rounds, but sagged a bit in the middle rounds, hampered somewhat by the wet footing caused by the pouring rain in the outdoor arena. Jadick had enough left to take the decision in the late rounds when the footing in the arena began to dry.   The verdict for Jadick, however, was surprisingly unpopular with the home crowd.   Finnegan was a competent southpaw who had taken both an Army and Navy and New England Lightweight title earlier in his career.

On December 7, 1928, Jadick defeated talented black boxer Bruce Flowers at Boston Garden in Boston, Massachusetts, in a ten-round points decision.  Although Flowers seemed to have an edge in the first part of the bout, Jadick won the decision with a strong comeback in the subsequent rounds. 

On January 11, 1929, Jadick faced a seventh round disqualification for holding against Jewish great Louis "Kid" Kaplan at the Boston Garden.  Jadick may have been outclassed by Kaplan, who had formerly taken the Featherweight Championship of the World in January 1925.

Wins over Henry Tuttle
On November 25, 1929, Jadick defeated Henry Tuttle, known as King Tut, a noted Minneapolis lightweight, in an important eighth round Technical Knockout.  Tuttle had hopes of competing for the World Lightweight Championship.  Their feature match in Philadelphia before a crowd of 7,000, catapulted Jadick to greater recognition, at least among regional boxing fans and officials. Tut did not return to the ring in the eighth round because of a badly injured eye.  Jadick had injured Tut's eye early in the bout, and as a result had won several of the succeeding rounds, until Tut appeared to rally in the fifth and sixth. Between the sixth and seventh rounds, the ring physician ordered an end to the bout after examining Tut. Jadick was two pounds lighter than Tut at 134, putting them both near the light welterweight minimum of 135.   One year later, Jadick defeated Tut again on October 4, 1930, in a ten-round points decision in Milwaukee, dashing Tuttle's hopes of becoming a lightweight contender.

Loss to Benny Bass, 1930

On December 8, 1930, at 132 pounds, Jadick first met exceptional boxer Benny Bass, in a non-title fight, losing in a close ten round unanimous points decision at the Arena in Philadelphia. Jadick used a rapid left, and a jarring right uppercut against his opponent, and seemed to have a decided edge in the fighting at times. Bass, stockier built, pressed the fighting in most of the bout and appeared stronger than Jadick, who had a reliable scientific defense partly due to his six-inch advantage in reach.  Bass was a former World Jr. Lightweight champion having taken the title in December 1929. He had also formerly held the World Featherweight Championship in the late 1920s. On July 31, 1934, Jadick would lose to Bass again in a ten-round points decision at Shibe Park in Philadelphia. 

On July 14, 1931, Jadick defeated Tony Herrera in a decisive ten round victory at the Myers Bowl in Pittsburgh, after having scored a clean knockdown of his opponent in the first round. Jadick clearly took six of the ten rounds, though one judge voted for Herrera.   On November 30, 1931, Jadick lost to Herrera at Motor Square Garden in Pittsburgh in a sixth round Technical Knockout just six weeks before the most important victory of his career against Tony Canzoneri.  By the time of the bout, Jadick was fully under the management of Tommy White.

Win over Lew Massey, 1931
On October 26, 1931, he defeated highly rated fellow Philadelphian Lew Massey at the Arena in Philadelphia in a bout that was stopped in the seventh because of a cut above Massey's left eye, causing a technical knock-out.

Jadick had fought a ten-round draw with Massey three weeks earlier at the same location before a crowd of 7,000. In the close draw match, Jadick was down in the first round with Massey's flurry of blows helping him to win it.  Massey tripped once in the seventh, briefly falling to the mat, but the bout was close with each boxer taking four rounds apiece.

World Light welter champ

On January 18, 1932, Jadick became the World Light Welterweight Champion after a ten-round Unanimous Decision against Tony Canzoneri at the Arena in Philadelphia, Pennsylvania. Jadick's jabbing left may have played a major role in his victory.  Jadick was very briefly down from a left to the jaw in the first round. The fighting was fierce with frequent toe to toe battling.  A few boxing historians today consider Jadick's win quite an upset considering the skill and achievements of Canzoneri, a three division world champion and both a light and jr. welterweight title holder. They attribute Jadick's win partially to partisan officiating by the Philadelphia judges and referees who may have favored the hometown hero.   Jadick's World Light Welterweight division title was recognized by the National Boxing Association (NBA) until September 1932, when their recognition of the division lapsed, though Jadick's claim to the title is still generally recognized through February 1933 when he was defeated by Battling Shaw.

Title defense against Tony Canzoneri, 1932
In a very significant win in a sanctioned light welterweight title match, Jadick defeated Tony Canzoneri, on July 18, 1932, for the second time.  The two light welterweights fought a ten-round split decision at Shibe Park in Philadelphia with Jadick scientifically warding off the more aggressive Canzoneri.  Jadick's long left jabs effectively halted the frequent advances of Canzoneri.  One judge voted for Canzoneri in the close decision, and the ruling for Jadick was not popular with many in the crowd, who may have been swayed by Canzoneri's more aggressive style.

NBA Light Welterweight Title Defense
Jadick defended the championship just once in a rematch against Tony Canzoneri on July 18, 1932, in Philadelphia, Pennsylvania, via Split Decision. In his one successful title defense, he retained the NBA light welterweight championship in one of the last sanctioned fights by the NBA shortly before they stopped recognizing Junior divisions in September of 1932. Despite having lost his title outside of the ring, Jadick continued reigning as the world light welterweight champion as recognized by the state of Louisiana before he lost the title to Mexican, Battling Shaw on February 20, 1933, by majority decision. Jadick had several non title bouts between his 3 world championship matches, but were not considered to be fought for his world title as his opponents all weighed over the 140lbs limit of the light welterweight division

World Light welter title loss, 1933
Jadick lost the World Light Welterweight Championship before 3,000 fans on February 20, 1933, in a decisive ten round mixed decision to Texan-born Mexican boxer "Battling" Shaw at the Coliseum Arena in New Orleans. The loss of the division title by Jadick so quickly was somewhat of a surprise to many of the spectators.  Both boxers weighed in at close to 136 pounds.  Jadick had the advantage in the early rounds attacking Shaw with stiff rights and left hooks to the head while Shaw went for the body.   In Shaw's first title defense, three months later in New Orleans, he was soundly defeated by Tony Canzoneri, who retook the title, knocking Shaw to the canvas in both the first and eighth rounds.  Canzoneri's dominance of Shaw made some boxing historians puzzle over how he lost twice to Jadick only the previous year. 

On November 17, 1933, Jadick beat Pete Nebo for the first time, defeating him in a ten-round points decision at the Cambria Athletic Club in Philadelphia.  

On December 8, 1933, Jadick defeated Tony Falco in a ten-round points decision at the Cambria Athletic Club in Philadelphia. His career and boxing record began a steady, rapidly accelerating decline after his victory. 

On April 6, 1934, Jadick defeated Charley Bedami in a ten-round Uanimous Decision at Holyoke, Massachusetts. 

In a noteworthy win, on February 18, 1935, Jadick, at 137 pounds, defeated Fritzie Zivic, 1940 NBA World Welterweight Champion, in a ten-round points decision at the Auditorium in Washington, D. C.   

At 145 1/4 pounds, on July 22, 1936, Jadick lost to 1940 Welterweight Champion as recognized by Maryland, Izzy Jannazzo, in a ten-round points decision at the Dykman Oval in Manhattan. In a decisive win, Jannazzo, soon to be a top welterweight contender, put Jadick on the canvas in the first, fourth and sixth rounds.    The fight was a benefit for the United Palestine Appeal.

Boxing retirement
From November 1935 to September 1937, Jadick lost all but one of his last twenty fights. He retired from boxing in 1937 after a long downhill slide in his career, fighting his last bout against Mike Piskin on September 24, 1937, at his first major boxing venue, Cambria Stadium in his beloved Philadelphia.

He died on April 3, 1970, at his home on West Silver Street in Philadelphia. Funeral services were held on April 7, the following Tuesday morning at St. Edmund's Catholic Church in Philadelphia.  He was buried at Holy Cross Cemetery, and was survived by his wife, Mary.

Achievements and honors
Jadick was elected to the Pennsylvania Boxing Hall of Fame in 1963.

Professional boxing record
All information in this section is derived from BoxRec, unless otherwise stated.

Official record

All newspaper decisions are officially regarded as “no decision” bouts and are not counted in the win/loss/draw column.

Unofficial record

Record with the inclusion of newspaper decisions in the win/loss/draw column.

See also 
List of light welterweight boxing champions
List of undisputed boxing champions

References

External links 
 

Johnny Jadick - CBZ Profile

 https://boxrec.com/media/index.php/National_Boxing_Association%27s_Quarterly_Ratings:_1932
 https://boxrec.com/media/index.php/National_Boxing_Association%27s_Quarterly_Ratings:_1933

1908 births
1970 deaths
Light-welterweight boxers
World boxing champions
World welterweight boxing champions
Boxers from Philadelphia
American male boxers